Arun Kamal is an Indian poet in modern Hindi literature with a progressive, ideological poetic style. Apart from poetry, Kamal has also written criticism and has done translations in Hindi. He was awarded the Sahitya Akademi Award for Hindi in 1998.

Arun Kamal's real name is Arun Kumar. For literary writing, he adopted the name Arun Kamal. He was born on 15 February 1954 at Nasriganj in Bihar. He has been a professor in the English Department of Patna University. He lives in Patna.

References

External links 

 Arun Kumar at Kavita Kosh

1954 births
Living people
People from Bihar
Indian poets
Hindi-language poets
Recipients of the Sahitya Akademi Award in Hindi
Academic staff of Patna University